Beaucaire is the name of several communes in France:

 Beaucaire, Gard, in the Gard department
 Gare de Beaucaire, a railway station
 Beaucaire, Gers, in the Gers department

See also
 Le souper de Beaucaire, a political pamphlet written by Napoleon Bonaparte in 1793